WBHP (1230 kHz, "The Big Talker") is a commercial AM radio station in Huntsville, Alabama and serves Madison County. The station is owned by San Antonio-based iHeartMedia and airs a news/talk format.  WBHP programming is simulcast on AM 800 WHOS in nearby Decatur, FM translator at 102.5 FM and on 102.1 WDRM-HD2 (HD Radio).    Its studios are located in Madison, Alabama and its transmitter is located southwest of downtown Huntsville.

Programming
WBHP and WHOS have a local morning drive news and talk show hosted by Toni Lowery and Gary Dobbs.  The rest of the weekday schedule is made up of nationally syndicated talk shows, mostly from co-owned Premiere Networks:  Glenn Beck, Sean Hannity, Michael Berry, Clyde Lewis and Coast to Coast AM with George Noory.  Independently syndicated Dave Ramsey is heard middays.

Weekends feature shows on money, real estate, cars, travel and home repair.  Weekend syndicated hosts include Rudy Maxa, Joe Pags, Gary Sullivan and Bill Cunningham.  Most hours begin with world and national news from Fox News Radio.

In addition to its regularly scheduled talk programming, the station is an affiliate of the Auburn Tigers football radio network and the Auburn Tigers men's basketball radio network.

History
The station was issued a construction permit in May 1931 and went on the air as WBHS on April 22, 1932, at 1200 AM as the first radio station in Huntsville.  It was a service of The Hutchens Company, a hardware firm.  The call sign stood for "World's Best Hardware Store."  The studios were in the Russel Erskine Hotel downtown.  WBHS later moved to a building on Governor’s Drive.

During the Great Depression the station ran into financial problems and went off the air in 1935. The FCC reassigned the frequency and the new station returned to the air on May 23, 1937 as WBHP.

WBHP had been through several owners until its acquisition by iHeartMedia, Inc. (formally Clear Channel Communications), its current licensee.  The current call letters stem from longtime previous owner Wilton "Buster" Harvey Pollard.

In 1941, due to the AM bang being expanded, WBHP moved from 1200 AM to its present-day 1230 AM frequency.

From its early days until the November 1997 switch to an all-news format, WBHP broadcast country music.   In the 1960s the country music station put its format aside for one hour each Sunday afternoon to air classical music. The program was called “The German Hour” and catered to Wernher von Braun’s German rocket scientists and their families.  More than 1500 German scientists, engineers and technicians were brought to Huntsville to work on developing rockets as part of Operation Paperclip.

In 2018, WBHP launched an FM translator on 102.5 to simulcast the station.

Former programming
WBHP and sister station WHOS were the flagship stations for the 1999-2000 final season of the Huntsville Channel Cats and for the short-lived Huntsville Tornado for the 2000-2001 hockey season. Both teams played their home games at the Von Braun Center and competed in the Central Hockey League.

Awards and honors
As a country music-formatted station, WBHP on-air personality Dana Webb was nominated for and won a Country Music Association Award as "Small Market Broadcast Personality of the Year" in 1986.

References

External links
WBHP official website

BHP
News and talk radio stations in the United States
Radio stations established in 1931
IHeartMedia radio stations
1931 establishments in Alabama